Sassano is a town and comune in the province of Salerno in the Campania region of south-western Italy.

Geography
The municipality borders with Buonabitacolo, Monte San Giacomo, Padula, Sala Consilina, Sanza and Teggiano. Its frazioni are Caiazzano, Peglio, San Rocco, Santa Maria, Silla and Varco Notar Ercole.

Prehistory
The area is the only known inland site in Italy with a significant quantity of Mycenean pottery.

See also

 The Sassano Project
Vallo di Diano

References

External links

Cities and towns in Campania
Localities of Cilento